Stedcombe House is a country house in the civil parish of Axmouth, in the East Devon district, in the county of Devon, England. It is recorded in the National Heritage List for England as a designated Grade I listed building. Richard Hallet purchased the estate in 1691 from Sir Walter Yonge, and built the house there in 1697.

References

Country houses in Devon
Grade I listed buildings in Devon
East Devon District